Hastings is a small village and beach resort in the parish of Christ Church, Barbados on the south-western coast. It has a beautiful white sandy beaches and is often a location for surfing on the island. Barbados' largest boardwalk, Richard Hayes boardwalk currently starts from here and runs straight to the nearby town Rockley. A Courtyard by Marriott hotel is located in Hastings.

See also
 List of cities, towns and villages in Barbados

References

Further reading
 

Populated coastal places in Barbados
Populated places in Barbados
Christ Church, Barbados